Robert Stadlober (born 3 August 1982) is an Austrian actor, voice actor and musician.

Life and career
Robert Stadlober was born in Friesach in the Austrian province of Carinthia, and grew up in Puchfeld in the Steiermark (Austria) and in Berlin (Germany). As a child, he worked as a voiceover artist for several films and he acted in different TV productions and motion picture films also. His largest success is playing the main role as Benjamin Lebert, a partially disabled teenager at a boarding school, in the film Crazy (2000). Later, he starred in Summer Storm (2004), a gay coming-of-age story set at a rowing summer-camp. Although The Advocate has claimed that he is bisexual, Stadtlober himself objects to such labelling, saying that he's just had some homosexual experiences and that this is normal.

He was awarded the "best young actor" award at the Montreal World Film Festival in 2004 for his portrayal in Summer Storm.

He is also a singer and musician. He used to be in the rock Band Gary with David Winter and Rasmus Engler where he was the lead singer and played the guitar. He is now a third of Indie band Escorial Gruen.

Further, since 2007 he also runs the independent record label Siluh records.

Until 2007, he made three movies together with Tom Schilling: Crazy (2000),  (2003) and Black Sheep (2006).

Stadlober currently lives in Berlin (2008). His sister is Anja Stadlober, also an actress.

Filmography

Voiceovers
Grosse Pause (Recess) – T.J. Detweiler (First two seasons only)
Das wandelnde Schloss (Howl's Moving Castle) (as Howl)

References

External links

 http://www.prisma-online.de/tv/person.html?pid=robert_stadlober
 http://www.deathtogary.de/ official homepage of his band
 http://www.siluh.com / homepage of his record label
 Robert Stadlober by CastingDB.eu

1982 births
People from Friesach
Austrian male film actors
Austrian male television actors
Austrian male voice actors
21st-century Austrian male actors
Waldorf school alumni
Living people